The Emergency Medicine Residents' Association (EMRA) is a professional organization that represents over 90% of resident physicians training in emergency medicine in the United States. EMRA is both the largest and the oldest independent medical resident group in the world. Its members include medical students, interns, residents, fellows, and alumni who are training in emergency medicine residencies in the United States and abroad. In 2008, approximately 7,000 residents were members of EMRA, and about 18,000 physicians were on the alumni rolls. Generally, members are required to be residents in good standing with an accredited emergency medicine residency training program.

EMRA's mission is to promote "excellence in patient care through the education and development of emergency medicine residency trained physicians". It was founded in 1974, and holds its administrative headquarters in Dallas, Texas.

References

External links
 EMRA's Homepage

Emergency medical responders
Medical and health student organizations
Medical associations based in the United States
Medical and health organizations based in Texas